Tony Lanigan (born 1968) is an Irish former hurler. At club level he played with Holycross–Ballycahill and was also a member of the Tipperary senior hurling team.

Career

Lanigan first played hurling at juvenile and underage levels with the Holycross–Ballycahill club. He won a divisional title in the minor grade in 1984, the same year he won a special county title as a schoolboy with Thurles Vocational School. Lanigan eventually progressed onto the club's senior team and won a Tipperary SHC title in 1990 after beating Cashel King Cormacs in the final. He also won four Mid Tipperary SHC titles between 1985 and 1999.

At inter-county level, had a two-year tenure with the Tipperary minor hurling team, however, Cork was the dominant team in the championship at the time. He immediately progressed onto the under-21 team and was at left corner-forward when the team that beat Offaly in the 1989 All-Ireland under-21 final. Lanigan's performances in the under-21 grade earned a call-up to the senior team's extended training panel during their 1989 All-Ireland SHC-winning campaign.

Honours

Holycross–Ballycahill
Tipperary Senior Hurling Championship: 1990
Mid Tipperary Senior Hurling Championship: 1985, 1989, 1990, 1991, 1997, 1999

Tipperary
All-Ireland Senior Hurling Championship: 1991, 1988
Munster Senior Hurling Championship: 1991
All-Ireland Under-21 Hurling Championship: 1989
Munster Under-21 Hurling Championship: 1989

References

External link
Tony Lanigan player profile

1968 births
Living people
Holycross-Ballycahill hurlers
Tipperary inter-county hurlers